Myroslav is a masculine given name. It may refer to:

Myroslav Bundash (born 1976), Ukrainian footballer
Myroslav Dumanskyi (born 1929), retired Soviet football player and current Ukrainian coach
Myroslav Dykun (born 1982), Ukrainian born British amateur wrestler
Myroslav Ivan Lubachivsky (1914–2000),  Major Archbishop of Lviv and head of the Ukrainian Greek Catholic Church
Myroslav Marynovych (born 1949), vice-rector of the Ukrainian Catholic University in Lviv
Myroslav Skoryk (born 1938), famous Ukrainian composer of diverse and impressive compositions
Myroslav Slavov (born 1990), Ukrainian football forward
Myroslav Stupar (born 1941), former Soviet and Ukrainian football referee

Ukrainian masculine given names